Toxopyrimidine is a vitamin B6 antagonist with potent convulsant effects.

See also 
Crimidine
Ginkgotoxin

References

External links

Aminopyrimidines
Primary alcohols
Neurotoxins
Convulsants
Vitamin B6 antagonists